Toribiong is a surname. Notable people with the surname include:

Johnson Toribiong (born 1946), Palauan lawyer and politician
Marina Toribiong (born 1994), Palauan canoeist